Adjudication is the legal process by which an arbiter or judge reviews evidence and argumentation, including legal reasoning set forth by opposing parties or litigants, to come to a decision which determines rights and obligations between the parties involved.

Adjudication can also refer to the processes at dance competitions, in television game shows and at other competitive forums, by which competitors are evaluated and ranked and a winner is found.

Legal processes
Adjudication may be defined as "the legal process of resolving a dispute. The formal giving or pronouncing of a judgment or decree in a court proceeding; also the judgment or decision given. The entry of a decree by a court in respect to the parties in a case. It implies a hearing by a court, after notice, of legal evidence on the factual issue(s) involved. The equivalent of a determination. It indicates that the claims of all the parties thereto have been considered and set at rest." In some cases, an application for adjudication is an alternative legal process instead of applying for a court hearing.

Construction law

Australia
Each state and territory has enacted security of payment legislation which provide for adjudication of progress construction claims, starting with New South Wales in 1999. There is very little harmony between the legislation in each jurisdiction regarding the scope of contract covered and the adjudication procedure. However, in all jurisdictions, adjudications are interim pending final resolution of the dispute under the relevant terms of the contract.

New South Wales
The Building and Construction Industry Security of Payment Act 1999  came into effect in New South Wales on 26 March 2000 and applies to all construction contracts commenced on or after that date. It is not possible to contract out of the legislation. Amendments to the Act made in 2013 are not retrospective, however, earlier amendments are. The Act does not apply to mining work, however, construction work ancillary to the operation of a mine is covered. The Act also does not apply to work undertaken for a resident owner within the meaning of the Home Building Act 1989.

In NSW, the 2016 case of Probuild Constructions (Aust) Pty Ltd v Shade Systems Pty Ltd has allowed an adjudicator's determination for a non-jurisdictional error to be overturned through judicial review. The case went against Brodyn Pty Ltd v Davenport (2004), which had held that judicial intervention was limited to cases of a breach of essential and basic requirements.

Queensland 
The Building and Construction Industry Payments Act 2004 (BCIPA) came into effect in Queensland in October, 2004. Through a statutory-based adjudication process a claimant can seek to resolve payment on account disputes. The act covers construction, and related supply of goods and services, contracts, whether written or verbal. BCIPA is regulated by the Building and Construction Industry Payments Agency, a branch of the Queensland Building Services.

Victoria 
Adjudication is a relatively new process introduced by the government of Victoria, Australia, to allow for the rapid determination of progress claims under building contracts or sub-contracts and contracts for the supply of goods or services in the building industry. This process was designed to ensure cash flow to businesses in the building industry, without parties getting tied up in lengthy and expensive litigation or arbitration. It is regulated by the Building and Construction Industry Security of Payment Act 2002.

Builders, sub-contractors and suppliers need to carefully choose a nominating authority to which they make an adjudication application.

United Kingdom
The relevant legislation in regard to construction in the United Kingdom is the Housing Grants, Construction and Regeneration Act 1996 (1996 Chapter 53), later amended by Part 8 of the Local Democracy, Economic Development and Construction Act 2009.

Any party to a construction contract has the right to refer a dispute arising under the contract to a third party for adjudication, whose decision shall be binding unless the courts or an arbitrator have already made a determination on the referred issue. The Act does not define "adjudication" or an "adjudicator", but an adjudicator's obligation is to act "impartially" (section 108(2)(e)). The "Scheme for Construction Contracts" set up under the Scheme for Construction Contracts (England and Wales) Regulations 1998 contains a set of adjudication provisions which are to apply to a construction contract unless the contract itself includes arrangements for adjudication which comply with statutory requirements. In Scotland, the Scheme for Construction Contracts (Scotland) Regulations 1998 apply.

In the case of Aspect Contracts (Asbestos) Limited (Respondent) v Higgins Construction Plc (Appellant), heard in 2015, the Supreme Court of England and Wales argued that the wording would have been clearer if had said "unless and until" instead of merely "until".

The phrase "true value adjudication" is sometimes used in relation to the role of an adjudicator, meaning that the adjudicator is asked to determine the true value of a completed construction where this may be different from the value claimed by the contractor and/or paid by the client. The term "smash and grab" claim refers to the practice of submitting a large interim payment application at the end of the construction phase of a project, but before completion of the final account, and the term "'smash and grab' adjudication" has been used in relation to several adjudication decisions regarding liability for interim payment of such claims.

In relation to a 2012 case, Herbosh-Kiere Marine Contractors Ltd v Dover Harbour Board, Matt Molloy notes that there can be a distinction between "statutory adjudication", applying the processes set out in legislation, and "contractual adjudication", where a complainant exercises a right provided for in their contract. In this case, which related to a wreck-removal agreement requiring the contractor to remove the remains of a boat sunk to stop torpedoes being fired into Dover Harbour during World War 1, the court determined that the adjudicator had exceeded his jurisdiction and the adjudicator's ruling was therefore not upheld.

Healthcare
"Claims adjudication" is a phrase used in the insurance industry to refer to the process of paying claims submitted or denying them after comparing claims to the benefit or coverage requirements. The adjudication process consists of receiving a claim from an insured person and then utilizing software to process claims and make a decision or doing so manually. If it is done automatically using software or a web-based subscription, the claim process is called auto-adjudication. Automating claims often improve efficiency and reduce expenses required for manual claims adjudication. Many claims are submitted on paper and are processed manually by insurance workers.

After the claims adjudication process is complete, the insurance company often sends a letter to the person filing the claim describing the outcome. The letter, which is sometimes referred to as remittance advice, includes a statement as to whether the claim was denied or approved. If the company denied the claim, it has to provide an explanation for the reason why under regional laws. The company also often sends an explanation of benefits that includes detailed information about how each service included in the claim was settled. Insurance companies will then send out payments to the providers if the claims are approved or to the provider's billing service.

The process of claims adjudication, in this context, is also called "medical billing advocacy".

Background investigations (Employment)
Adjudication is the process directly following a background investigation where the investigation results are reviewed to determine if a candidate should be awarded a security clearance, or be suitable for a public trust position, which is a job that requires a very knowledgeable and responsible person, often related to national security. It may be determined that the person is not suitable for a public trust position, but is suitable for a non-sensitive position. However, a person may be deemed unsuitable for any position.

From the United States Department of the Navy Central Adjudication Facility: "Adjudication is the review and consideration of all available information to ensure an individual's loyalty, reliability, and trustworthiness are such that entrusting an individual with national security information or assigning an individual to sensitive duties is clearly in the best interest of national security."

Emergency response 
Adjudication is the "process of identifying, with reasonable certainty, the type or nature of material or device that set off an alarm and assessing the potential threat that the material or device might pose with corresponding implications for the need to take further action."

Referring to a minor
Referring to a minor, the term adjudicated can refer to children that are under a court's jurisdiction, usually as a result of having engaged in delinquent behavior and not having a legal guardian that could be entrusted with being responsible for him or her. A child dependency or neglect adjudication can also result in a determination that a child is in need of services. Different US states have different processes for declaring a child as adjudicated. Arizona state law defines a dually adjudicated child as "a child who is found to be dependent or temporarily subject to court jurisdiction pending an adjudication of a dependency petition and who is alleged or found to have committed a delinquent or incorrigible act". According to Illinois state law, "adjudicated" means that the Juvenile Court has entered an order declaring that a child "is neglected, abused, dependent, a minor requiring authoritative intervention, a delinquent minor or an addicted minor".

See also

Administrative law
Alternative dispute resolution (e.g. Arbitration, Mediation)
Collateral estoppel
Dispute resolution (e.g. Lawsuit)
Jurisprudence
Res judicata

References

Further reading
Darren Noble, Users' Guide to Adjudication in Victoria (Anstat 2009)
Alexander Bickel, The Least Dangerous Branch: The Supreme Court at the Bar of Politics, 2nd ed. (Yale University Press, 1986).
Gad Barzilai, Communities and Law: Politics and Cultures of Legal Identities (Ann Arbor: University of Michigan Press, 2003).
Erwin Chemerinsky, Constitutional Law: Principles and Policies (Aspen Publishers, 2006).
Ronald Dworkin, Taking Rights Seriously (Harvard University Press, 2005, originally 1977).
Conor Gearty, Principles of Human Rights Adjudication (Oxford University Press, 2005).
Michael J. Gorr and Sterling Harwood, eds., Controversies in Criminal Law: Philosophical Essays on Responsibility and Procedure (Westview Press, 1992).
Michael J. Gorr and Sterling Harwood, eds., Crime and Punishment: Philosophic Explorations (Wadsworth Publishing Co., 2000; originally Jones and Bartlett Publishers, 1996).
H.L.A. Hart, The Concept of Law (Oxford University Press, 1961).
Sterling Harwood, Judicial Activism: A Restrained Defense (Austin & Winfield Publishers, 1993).
Allan C. Hutchinson, It's All in the Game: A Nonfoundationalist Account of Law and Adjudication (Duke University Press, 2000).
David Lyons, Ethics and the Rule of Law (Cambridge University Press, 1984).
David Lyons, Moral Aspects of Legal Theory (Cambridge University Press, 1993).
John T. Noonan and Kenneth I. Winston, eds., The Responsible Judge: Readings in Judicial Ethics (Praeger Publishers, 1993).
Kathleen M. Sullivan and Gerald Gunther, Constitutional Law, 15th ed. (Foundation Press, 2004).
Harry H. Wellington, Interpreting the Constitution: The Supreme Court and the Process of Adjudication (Yale University Press, 1992).

Lectures
 Lecture by Sir Christopher Greenwood entitled International Law in the Age of Adjudication in the Lecture Series of the United Nations Audiovisual Library of International Law
 Lecture by Stephen M. Schwebel entitled The Merits (and Demerits) of International Adjudication and Arbitration in the Lecture Series of the United Nations Audiovisual Library of International Law

Judgment (law)
Administrative law
Civil procedure